G. Satyamurthy (24 May 1954 – 14 December 2015) was an Indian screenwriter who predominantly worked in Telugu cinema. He worked as a story writer for over 90 films and as a dialogue writer for over 400 films. He is the father of film composer Devi Sri Prasad and singer Sagar.

Devatha (1982), Kirayi Kotigadu (1983), Abhilasha (1983), Challenge (1984), Jwala (1985), Srinivasa Kalyanam (1987), Khaidi No. 786 (1988), Bhale Donga (1989), Nari Nari Naduma Murari (1990), Chanti (1992), Bangaru Bullodu (1993), Matru Devo Bhava (1993), Pedarayudu (1995), Amma Donga (1995), Pelli (1997) were some of his notable films. Satyamurthy collaborated with Chiranjeevi on many of his successful films.

Early life 
Gorthi Satyamurthy was born on 24 May 1953/4 in Vedurupaka of Rayavaram mandal, East Godavari district, Andhra Pradesh. He completed his B. Sc. degree in Ramachandrapuram. Later he studied B.Ed. at Andhra National College of Education in Machilipatnam and started his teaching career.

Career

Literary career 
Satyamurthy's passion for literature led him to start essay writing. He began his literary journey with the novel Chaitanyam. His works, Pavitrulu, Punarankitam, Edaloyala Nidurinche, Digambara Ambaram and Adhara Garalam have especially entertained the literary lovers. He continued his writing process by plotting the conflict in human relationships. Satyamurthy's reputation as a story writer and novelist turned him towards the film industry.

Film career 
Satyamurthy started his film career as a story writer with the film Devatha (1982), directed by K. Raghavendra Rao and produced by D. Ramanaidu. With the success of this film, he got wide recognition. Bava Maradallu, Kirayi Kotigadu, Abhilasha, Challenge, Jwala, Bhale Donga, Matru Devo Bhava, Kanchana Sita, Chanti, Pedarayudu, Srinivasa Kalyanam, Nari Nari Naduma Murari, Bangaru Bullodu, Pelli, Nyayam Kosam, Khaidi No. 786, Amma Donga were his successful films. Satyamurthy played a key role in Chiranjeevi's film career. He also directed the films Dadar Express, Chaitanyam, Baava garu, Palletoori Mogudu.

Personal life 
He had three children  sons Devi Sri Prasad, and Sagar and a daughter Padmini. He died on 14 December 2015 due to Myocardial infarction.

Filmography

References

External links 

 

Screenwriters from Andhra Pradesh
Writers from Andhra Pradesh
People from East Godavari district
Telugu screenwriters
Telugu writers
2015 deaths